The Union for Bradford and Bingley Staff and Associated Companies (UBAC) was a trade union in the United Kingdom.

The union was founded in 1977 as the Bradford and Bingley Staff Association, changing its name in 2001.  It represented staff working for Bradford and Bingley and for Alltel Mortgage Solutions, having 2,796 members by 2002.  It was a founder member of the Financial Services Staff Federation and of the Alliance for Finance, and was affiliated to the Trades Union Congress.

In 2009, it merged with Advance.

References

Defunct trade unions of the United Kingdom
Trade unions established in 1977
Trade unions disestablished in 2009
1977 establishments in the United Kingdom
Finance sector trade unions
Trade unions based in North Yorkshire